Chancellor is a surname. Notable people with the surname include:

Alexander Chancellor (1940–2017), British journalist, son of Christopher Chancellor
Alice Chancellor (1912–1985), American engineer
Anna Chancellor (born 1965), British actress, granddaughter of Christopher Chancellor
Cecilia Chancellor (born 1966), British model, daughter of Alexander Chancellor
Christopher Chancellor (1904–1989), British journalist, son of John Chancellor (1870–1952)
Edward Chancellor (born 1962), English financial historian and investment strategist, grandson of Christopher Chancellor
Jhon Chancellor (born 1992), Venezuelan football player
John Chancellor (1927–1996), American journalist
John Chancellor (British administrator) (1870–1952), father of Christopher Chancellor
Justin Chancellor, bassist for Tool
Kam Chancellor (born 1988), American football player
Richard Chancellor (died 1556), English explorer and navigator

Fictional characters:
Katherine Chancellor, character on The Young and the Restless

Occupational surnames
English-language occupational surnames